Camp Snoopy is a Peanuts-themed area for children at several Cedar Fair amusement parks.

History
Camp Snoopy was first introduced at Knott's Berry Farm in 1983. This was the first amusement park with a section dedicated to children under 12 years old.

On August 27, 2013, Camp Snoopy at Cedar Point received the relocated Frog Hopper which was renamed Woodstock's Airmail and Jr. Gemini was renamed Wilderness Run. On August 16, 2017, Carowinds announced Planet Snoopy would be re-themed and expanded by six new rides to create Camp Snoopy for the 2018 season.

Locations

Current

Former

Rides
 Carowinds: Beagle Scout Acres, Camp Bus, Charlie Brown’s Wind-Up, Flying Ace Balloon Race, Kite Eating Tree, Peanuts Pirates, Peanuts Trailblazers, Pig Pens Mud Buggies, Snoopy Vs. Red Baron, Snoopy’s Junction, Wilderness Run, Woodstock Express, Woodstock Whirlybirds

 Cedar Point: Balloon Race, Camp Bus, Charlie Brown’s Wind-Up, Linus’ Beetle Bugs, Peanuts 500, Wilderness Run, Woodstock Express, Woodstock’s Airmail 

 Knott’s Berry Farm: Balloon Race, Camp Bus, Charlie Brown’s Kite Flyer, Flying Ace, Grand Sierra Railroad, High Sierra Ferris Wheel, Huff and Puff, Linus Launcher, Pig Pens Mud Buggies, Rapid River Run, Rocky Mountain Trucking Company, Sierra Sidewinder, Timberline Twister, Woodstock Airmail

 Michigan’s Adventure: Beagle Scout Acres, Beagle Scout Lookout, Camp Bus, Peanuts Trailblazers, Pig Pens Mud Buggies, Woodstock Express

References

External links

 Camp Snoopy Photo Gallery at The Point Online

Cedar Fair attractions
Amusement rides introduced in 1983
Amusement rides introduced in 1999
Amusement rides introduced in 2000
Amusement rides introduced in 2001
Amusement rides that closed in 2010
Cedar Point
Dorney Park & Wildwater Kingdom
Knott's Berry Farm
Worlds of Fun
Valleyfair
Peanuts in amusement parks
Themed areas in Cedar Fair amusement parks